Edmund R. McDavid served as the 26th Secretary of State of Alabama from 1904 to 1907. 

Before McDavid became Secretary of State he was in the insurance industry. He worked for Southern Mutual Fire Insurance Company and the Birmingham Underwriters' Agency. He was appointed Secretary of State by Governor William D. Jelks.

References

alabama Democrats